Acts of Fear and Love is the third studio album by English punk rock duo Slaves, released on 17 August 2018. It is the final album released by the band under their former name before changing to their current name, "Soft Play".

Track listing

Charts

References

External links 
 
 Acts of Fear and Love at Genius
 

2018 albums
Soft Play albums
Virgin EMI Records albums